Lam Tei Interchange (Chinese: 藍地交匯處) is a major traffic interchange in Lam Tei, Tuen Mun District, New Territories, Hong Kong. It connects Castle Peak Road, Yuen Long Highway and Tsing Lun Road.

See also
 List of streets and roads in Hong Kong

References

Roads in the New Territories
Lam Tei